Stephen Snobelen is a professor of the history of science and technology at the University of King's College in Halifax, Nova Scotia. His current teaching and research interests are History of science (Early Modern and nineteenth century);  Isaac Newton and Newton's theological writings and prophetic writings, Science and religion; The popularization of science; Radical theology in the Early Modern period; and Millenarianism.

He was featured in a BBC documentary on this subject matter, titled Newton: The Dark Heretic. Snobelen is a founding member of the Newton Project, UK and director of the Newton Project, Canada.

In 2002, Snobelen was awarded the John Templeton Foundation Science and Religion Course Award for his two courses at University of King's College, Science and Religion: Historical Perspectives and Science and Religion: Contemporary Perspectives.

References

External links
Personal page at King's
Newton Project, UK
Newton Project, Canada
Isaac Newton Theology, Prophecy, Science and Religion- writings on Newton by Stephen David Snobelen

20th-century Canadian historians
Canadian male non-fiction writers
Living people
Academic staff of University of King's College
Year of birth missing (living people)
21st-century Canadian historians